Miss Tulip Stays the Night is a 1955 British comedy crime film directed by Leslie Arliss and starring Diana Dors, Patrick Holt, Jack Hulbert and Cicely Courtneidge. The screenplay concerns a crime writer and his wife who stay at a country house, where a mysterious corpse appears.

It was also known as Dead by Morning. It was the last major feature film from director Leslie Arliss.

Plot
A novelist (Patrick Holt) and his wife (Diana Dors) are sleeping peacefully in their new cottage when a mysterious older lady (Cicely Courtneidge) arrives, apparently stranded in a storm. She hands the writer her gun and some jewellery for safe-keeping, and asks for a bed for the night. Unfortunately, someone shoots her during the night and the author is accused of the crime. He is forced to turn detective to defend himself.

Cast
 Diana Dors - Kate Dax
 Patrick Holt - Andrew Dax
 Jack Hulbert - Constable Feathers
 Cicely Courtneidge - Millicent Tulip/Angela Tulip
 A. E. Matthews - Mr Potts
 Joss Ambler - Inspector Thorne
 Pat Terry-Thomas [Ida Patlanski] - Judith Gale
 George Roderick - Sergeant Akers
 Brian Oulton - Dr. Willis
 Ian Wilson - Police photographer
 Archie Terry-Thomas -  Archie Dax [dog]

Production
The script was based on  radio play by Nan Marriott-Watson. This had been performed on Australian radio in 1948.

Ron Randell was reportedly offered the lead.

Hulbert and Courtnidge's casting was announced in August 1954. It was the first time they had made a film together since 1939. It was the first film made by a company formed by ex-publicity officer William Luckwell and D Winn. Producer John Douglas did sound on early Hulbert films and director Leslie Arliss had written scripts for Courtidge and Hulbert. It was shot at the studio at Walton on Thames. Filming took place in July 1954. Dors' fee was £1,500.

Critical reception
The Monthly Film Bulletin called it "a remarkably poor piece of craftsmanship in almost every sense."

The Manchester Guardian said "the stupendous silliness of its plot and dialogue gives a certain wild period charm" to the movie.

TV Guide called the film "badly done on all counts"; whereas The Digital Fix wrote, "Miss Tulip manages to combine comedy and murder with efficient ease".

Filmink argued the film should have focused on Dors rather than Holt.

References

External links

Miss Tulip Stays the Night at BFI
Miss Tulip Stays the Night at Letterbox DVD

1955 films
1950s crime comedy films
Films directed by Leslie Arliss
British crime comedy films
1955 comedy films
1950s English-language films
1950s British films
British black-and-white films